This is a list of Iranian provinces by Human Development Index as of 2021 with data for the year 2021.

See also
List of countries by Human Development Index

References 

Human Development Index
Iran
Iran